Squalius illyricus, the Illyrian chub, is a species of ray-finned fish in the family Cyprinidae.
It inhabits karstic waters of Bosnia and Herzegovina, Croatia and Albania. Its natural habitats are rivers and water storage areas. It is threatened by habitat loss.

References

Squalius
Freshwater fish of Europe
Fish described in 1858
Taxonomy articles created by Polbot
Endemic fauna of the Balkans
Endemic fish of the Neretva basin
Species endangered by river-damming
Fish of Bosnia and Herzegovina